Galacticast is a Canadian web series created by Rudy Jahchan and Casey McKinnon. The first episode aired on May 8, 2006.

The program is a sketch comedy video blog that parodies the latest science fiction or internet meme and responds to feedback from their loyal fanbase. Though it first launched as a variety channel, it later switched exclusively to comedy.

After a lengthy hiatus, the show came back in November 2008 with a fake commercial produced for comic artist Tony Moore.

Cast
McKinnon and Jahchan usually take the lead roles in each episode, but also call on their friends and fellow actors to guest star. McKinnon often plays multiple characters in a single episode.

Production
Most episodes are written and directed by Jahchan, with the exception of Battlestar Galacticast which was directed by independent filmmaker Matt Campagna. McKinnon is the primary editor, but special effects are usually done by both creators.

Recurring characters
 McKinnon
 Jahchan
 Doctor Who
 Superman
 Queen Kong (reference to King Kong)
 Daleks
 Darth Vader
 Emperor Palpatine
 R2-D2

Distribution
The show receives over 250,000 views each month and is available for subscription via YouTube, iTunes and RSS.

Awards

References

External links
 
 
 

Canadian comedy web series
Canadian science fiction web series
Video podcasts
2000s YouTube series
2006 web series debuts
2006 podcast debuts
2008 podcast endings